Lee's Summit High School is a high school in Lee's Summit, Missouri, United States.  It is located near downtown Lee's Summit on Blue Parkway, next to the intersection of U.S. Route 50 and Route 291.  It is one of three high schools in the Lee's Summit R-VII School District.

History
The original building, built in 1953 using military surplus paint, has been added onto throughout the years.  The first addition in 1963 was built to house freshmen and sophomores.  Later, a Field-house and Performing Arts center were added (1963 and 1979 respectively).  A corridor connecting the cafeteria and the "B Building" was then added (this glass hallway is referred to as "the Breezeway"). A major addition, including a lecture hall was completed during the 2000-01 school year. Recently, a weight room was added during the 2009-2010 school year.

Academics
Lee's Summit is an A+ designated high school. LSHS has received prestigious honors, including the Missouri Gold Star School award for 3 years and a U.S. News & World Report "Best High School" in 2009, 2010, 2011 and 2012.

Extracurricular activities
Lee's Summit High School has an Air Force Junior ROTC program, which has been awarded AFJROTC Distinguished Unit many times, most recent being the 2017-2018 school year.  LSHS AFJROTC also has different types of activities such as Raider Team, Drill Team, and Honor Guard. The Honor Guard team has presented the colors in many NCAA Sport Tournaments, the 2016 Ringside World Boxing Championship, and recent NASCAR races.

Notable alumni
Paul Coverdell (Class of 1957), U.S. Senator 
Forrest Griffith, former professional football player
Angela Lindvall (Class of 1997), fashion model 
Audrey Lindvall (Class of 2001), fashion model 
Matt Tegenkamp (Class of 2000), former Olympian 
Pat Metheny (Class of 1972), Grammy Award-winning jazz guitarist 
Mike Metheny (Class of 1967), trumpeter, educator
Bruce Polen, college football player and coach
Robert K. Dixon, member of the Intergovernmental Panel on Climate Change
Drew Lock (Class of 2015),  Seattle Seahawks Quarterback
KC Lightfoot (Class of 2018), 2020 Olympics Track and field, pole vaulter

References

External links
Official Website

Educational institutions established in 1953
Buildings and structures in Lee's Summit, Missouri
High schools in Jackson County, Missouri
Public high schools in Missouri
1953 establishments in Missouri